Political Islam is any interpretation of Islam as a source of political identity and action. It can refer to a wide range of individuals and/or groups who advocate the formation of state and society according to their understanding of Islamic principles. It may also refer to use of Islam as a source of political positions and concepts. Political Islam represents one aspect of the Islamic revival that began in the 20th century, and not all forms of political activity by Muslims are discussed under the rubric of political Islam. Most academic authors use the term Islamism to describe the same phenomenon or use the two terms interchangeably. There are new attempts to distinguish between Islamism as religiously based political movements and political Islam as a national modern understandings of Islam shared by secular and Islamist actors.

Development of the term
The terminology which is used for the phenomenon of political Islam differs among experts. Martin Kramer was one of the first experts who started using the term “political Islam” in 1980. In 2003, he stated that political Islam can also be seen as tautology because nowhere in the Muslim world is a religion separated from politics. Some experts use terms like Islamism, pointing out the same set of occurrences or they confuse both terms. Dekmejian was amongst the first of the experts who made remarks on politicisation of Islam in the context of the failure of secular Islamic governments while he uses both Islamism and Fundamentalism at the same time (rather than political Islam).

The term political Islam has been used in connection with foreign communities, referring to the movements or groups which have invested in a broad fundamentalist revival that is connected to a certain political agenda. M. A. Muqtedar Khan incorporates into political Islam all the Islamic movements promoting a political system based solely on Islam which must be followed by every Muslim. Some of the experts also use other descriptive terms in order to distinguish various ideological courses within political Islam: conservative, progressive, militant, radical, jihadist etc. Bill Warner, a physicist and critic of Political Islam, uses the term political Islam for those aspects of Islamic doctrine that affect non-Muslims (Kafirs) and non-Muslim societies. He has been criticised for identifying Islam with Islamism and for his methodology. In 2011 the Southern Poverty Law Center included him in a list of ten anti-Islam hardliners in the United States.

In Muslim countries
Some factions in the Middle East have come to associate the idea of modernities with the intrusions of colonial imperialism. In some Muslim countries, especially Egypt and Pakistan, political counter-movements with religious ideological leanings took root. The reasons are multifaceted. The collapse of the Ottoman Empire was a seismic event that created many aftershocks. The region experienced turbulence for many years as Arab countries fell within the cultural and colonial sphere of European nations. Under increasing cultural pressures Muslims asserted their national identities and cultural heritage, and some factions emphasized religious dimensions. In Egypt the weakness of Muslims was blamed on poor adherence to scripture. According to Hassan al-Banna, European culture was materialistic, immoral and based on class selfishness and usury. Other contributing factors may have been opposition to modernizing influences, overall poor governance and low levels of education in the population.

Documentation Centre Political Islam

The Documentation Centre Political Islam - full name: Austrian Fund for the documentation of religiously motivated political extremism (Documentation Centre Political Islam) - was set up in 2020 by the Austrian government made up of the ÖVP and the Greens and is intended to "scientifically document and research political Islam". It is an independent fund within the meaning of the Austrian Foundation and Fund Act 2015. Lisa Fellhofer is the director, the scientific advisory board is headed by Mouhanad Khorchide. Other members of the Advisory Board included Susanne Schröter, Lorenzo Vidino, Mathias Rohe, Handan Aksünger-Kizil, Heiko Heinisch, Herbert Kalb, Kenan Güngör, Elham Manea and Katharina Pabel. The Documentation Center Political Islam is based in Vienna and has produced a number of scientific publications since it was founded.

Austria launched the initiative on July 2020 to identify and register social and educational institutions that are the targets of Islamist-controlled organisations for political purposes. Part of the new approach is to monitor social media and integrate this data with research and documentation of religiously motivated political extremism. In view of the wave of Mahsa Amini protests in Iran, the Austrian fund presented a basic report on political Islam in the Twelver Shi'ism in 2022. The Islamic Republic is attempting to exert influence abroad in the cultural, religious and educational sectors through branch offices such as foundations or religious centres. Examples include the Islamic Center in Hamburg (IZH) and the Imam Ali Center (IAZ) in Vienna.

In 2022 the Documentation Centre Political Islam has spent a year looking into the activities of the Islamic Association in Austria (IVÖ). An organization that runs a mosque in Vienna’s Jewish neighbourhood is allegedly responsible for propagating antisemitism, anti-Israel hatred, and support for Hamas and the Muslim Brotherhood. The IVÖ operates in Hidaya Mosque, one of the city’s oldest and largest houses of Muslim prayer in Austria. The 143 page report — compiled by the Vienna-based think tank — detailed the promotion of Muslim Brotherhood ideology by the mosque’s imam and president. “We must not and will not allow radical preachers in the spirit of political Islam to poison our youth with homophobic, misogynist, child-threatening and antisemitic ideas,” Ewa Ernst-Dziedzic, the human rights spokeswoman for the Green Party in Austria, told Der Standard.

See also 
 Political aspects of Islam
 Post-Islamism
 Islam Yes, Islamic Party No

References

External links 
 dokumentationsstelle.at (official website)

Further reading 
Ankerl, G.(2000): Coexisting Contemporary Civilizations. Arabo-Muslim, Bharati, Chinese, and Western. (INU PRESS, Geneva.)
Hamid, S. & McCants, W. (2016). Rethinking Political Islam. Brookings Institution.
Hoover Institution. (2017). Islamism in Maritime Southeast Asia. The Caravan, 1715.
 Tausch, Arno (2023). Political Islam and Religiously Motivated Political Extremism. SpringerBriefs in Political Science. Springer, Cham. https://doi.org/10.1007/978-3-031-24854-2_2, Published 16 February 2023, Print ISBN 978-3-031-24853-5; open access: https://link.springer.com/book/10.1007/978-3-031-24854-2

Islamism
Sharia